A beauty deity is a god or (usually) goddess associated with the concept of beauty. Classic examples in the Western culture are the Greek goddess Aphrodite and her Roman counterpart, Venus. The following is a list of beauty deities across different cultures. For some deities, beauty is only one of several aspects they represent, or a lesser one. Male deities are italicized.

African

Egyptian
Hathor
Nefertem
Astarte

Yoruba
Oshun

American

Aztec
Xochipilli
Xōchiquetzal

Vodou
Erzulie

Asian

Chinese

Yang Asha

Hindu
Dewi Ratih
Indrani
Kartikeya
Lakshmi
Parvati
Saraswati
Oindrila
Veljhini-Mary

Japanese
Kisshōten

Mesopotamia
Inanna (also known as Ishtar)
Astarte

European

Albanian
Prende

Etruscan

Aplu
Turan

Greek

Adonis (note: a mortal, occasionally depicted as a god)
Aglaea
Aphrodite
Apollo
Charis
Charites
Kale

Irish
Clíodhna

Norse
Freyja

Roman
Apollo
Venus

Slavic
Lada

Oceania

Tahitian
Tāne

See also
List of fertility deities
List of love and lust deities

 
Beauty